Club Fantastic Tour (also advertised as Club Fantastic ‘83 Tour) was the debut concert tour by English musical duo Wham!, launched in support of their first studio album Fantastic (1983). It was sponsored by Fila sportswear and spanned two months from October to late November, comprising 30 sold-out shows across England, Scotland and Wales.

Background
Wham! announced a tour in August. Their co-manager Simon Napier-Bell had a plan to raise some revenue; if little money was to be made from records, then it was time for the duo to begin performing with a 30-date tour of the UK. Napier-Bell secured a £50,000 sponsorship deal with the sportswear manufacturer Fila, with George Michael and Andrew Ridgeley wearing the company's clothing on stage throughout the tour.

Halfway through the tour, Michael lost his voice and had to cancel ten consecutive shows; concerts were pushed back and rescheduled.

Concert synopsis
The show started with Michael entering the stage right-side in yellow Fila sports gear, and Ridgeley entering the stage left-side in red Fila sports gear while the band played "Bad Boys". Pepsi and Shirlie, backing singers and dancers, ran on stage for "Club Tropicana".

Ridgeley then announced the next song, "Blue", a slow love ballad. He held a plectrum in his mouth and shook hands. They then sang "Wham Rap!", dancing as a foursome. They continued with "A Ray Of Sunshine", which ended the first part of the set.
During the break a screen appeared and the crowd were shown family photos such as Ridgeley in pyjamas, and a young Michael in glasses. A mixed compilation of the group's music videos was played.

Then Michael sang "Careless Whisper" to a backing track on his own. He and Ridgeley changed into white Wham! singlet T-shirts and sang "Bad Boys". "Love Machine" followed, then "Nothing Looks The Same In The Light". "Come On" ended the set, with the two playing a mock game of badminton, occasionally whacking a shuttlecock out to the crowd.

The encore was "Young Guns" with the duo wearing camp cowboy outfits, "Wham Rap!" with them wearing white, and finally Chic's 1979 disco hit "Good Times".

Opening acts
The group decided to go back to their clubbing roots and had Gary Crowley (of Capital Radio) as the opening DJ act. Also included were some body-poppers called Eklypse who did dance routines for over an hour before the show.

Set list

The first set saw the band play most of the hits from the Fantastic album before George Michael was on stage alone singing tracks like "Careless Whisper", an unreleased track.

The average set list was as follows:
"Young Guns (Go for It)"
"Club Tropicana"
"Blue"
"Wham Rap! (Enjoy What You Do)"
"A Ray of Sunshine"
Break
"Careless Whisper"
"Bad Boys"
"Love Machine" (The Miracles cover)
"Nothing Looks the Same in the Light"
"Come On!"
"Young Guns (Go for It!)"
"Wham Rap! (Enjoy What You Do)"
"Good Times"

Tour dates
Tour dates as printed in the official Club Fantastic 1983 tour programme.

Personnel

Andrew Ridgeley
George Michael
Shirlie Holliman 
Pepsi DeMacque 

Musicians
Tommy Eyre — keyboards
Deon Estus — bass guitar
Trevor Morrell — drums
Robert Ahwaii — guitar
David "Babs" Baptiste — saxophone
Paul Spong — trumpet
Colin Graham — trumpet
Janey Hallet — backing vocals
Gee — backing vocals
Jenny — backing vocals

Danny Cummings — percussion
Mike Brady — recorder 
Barry Mead — tour manager
Ken — production manager
Glenn — Guitar Tech
Wendy — Assistant Tour Manager
Lesley Morrall — wardrobe 
Mel — hair & makeup
Promoter — Harvey Goldsmith Entertainments
Management — Simon Napier Bell & Jazz Summers
Personal security —  Dave Moulder 
 Concert Publishing Co. — programme & merchandising
Sponsor
FILA — sportswear

Comments
Gary Crowley, warm-up man on the tour, described it as "Some of my bestest bestest memories  .... The nearest I’ll ever get to being in The Beatles’ A Hard Day's Night." – 26 December 2016

See also
The Faith Tour

References 

George Michael concert tours
1983 concert tours